Hya is an Afro-Asiatic language spoken in northern Cameroon and neighboring regions of Nigeria.

Distribution
The Hya language is spoken only in Amsa, a locality situated about 10 km south of Rumsiki where Psikya is spoken, on the border with Nigeria (Mogodé commune, Mayo-Tsanaga department, Far North Region). It may be the same as the "Higi" dialect Ghyá as listed by R. Mohrlang.

Classification
Higi (spoken in Nigeria), Psikya, and Hya are three distinct but close languages belonging to the Margi group of languages.

Notes 

Biu-Mandara languages
Languages of Cameroon
Languages of Nigeria